Vallecito Creek is a tributary stream of Carrizo Creek, in San Diego County, California.

Vallecito Creek has its source at the southeast end of Mason Valley  as a continuation of Vallecito Wash.

References

Rivers of San Diego County, California
Rivers of Southern California